is a Japanese football player. He plays for Matsue City FC.

Career
Tomoya Takahata joined J3 League club SC Sagamihara in 2017. He joined Matsue City FC after two seasons in J3 League.

Club statistics
Updated to 22 February 2020.

References

External links

1994 births
Living people
Ritsumeikan University alumni
Association football people from Hyōgo Prefecture
Japanese footballers
J3 League players
Japan Football League players
SC Sagamihara players
Matsue City FC players
Association football midfielders